The Chan-Ya-Ta Site (13BV1) is a Late Prehistoric village in Buena Vista County, Iowa, United States, in which Native Americans lived in large earthlodge structures surrounded by a fortified ditch. The site is part of the Mill Creek Culture, which flourished in northwest Iowa 1100-1200 CE.

The site name is an amalgam of the first letters of the names of the different landowners who allowed access to the site, and is pronounced "chen-yata". It was the scene of the first Iowa Archeological Society field school.

See also
Mound
Mound builder (people)
Earthwork (archaeology)

References

National Register of Historic Places in Buena Vista County, Iowa
Archaeological sites on the National Register of Historic Places in Iowa
Geography of Buena Vista County, Iowa
Mounds in Iowa
Native American history of Iowa